Cirsium edule, the edible thistle or Indian thistle, is a species of thistle in the genus Cirsium, native to western North America from southeastern Alaska south through British Columbia to Washington and Oregon, and locally inland to Idaho.  It is a larval host to the mylitta crescent and the painted lady.

Cirsium edule is a tall herbaceous perennial plant, reaching  in height. The leaves are very spiny, lobed, 10–30 cm long and 2–5 cm broad (smaller on the upper part of the flower stem). The inflorescence is 3–4 cm diameter, purple, with numerous disc florets but no ray florets. The achenes are 4–5 mm long, with a downy pappus which assists in wind dispersal. It is monocarpic, growing as a low rosette of leaves for a number of years, then sending up the tall flowering stem in spring, with the plant dying after seed maturation.

Edible thistle is used by Native Americans for its edible roots and young shoots. The roots are sweet, but contain inulin, which gives some people digestive problems.

Varieties
 Cirsium edule var. edule - Oregon, Washington
 Cirsium edule var. macounii (Greene) D.J.Keil - Oregon, Washington, British Columbia, Alaska
 Cirsium edule var. edule wenatchense D.J.Keil - Washington

References

External links
Turner Photographics Pacific Northwest Wildflowers
Lady Bird Johnson Wildflower Center, University of Texas
Calphotos photo gallery, University of California
Paul Slichter, Thistles East of the Cascade Mountains, Indian Thistle, Edible Thistle  Cirsium edule var. wenatchense

edule
Flora of North America
Edible plants
Plants described in 1841